Krishnadevaraya College of Dental Sciences and Hospital  is a Private Dental College in Bengaluru and is affiliated to the Rajiv Gandhi University of Health Sciences headquartered at Bengaluru, Karnataka, India.

Location

Krishnadevaraya College of Dental Sciences and Hospital is spread out on 133 acres of calm and green land about 1 km off from the National Highway 7, near Yelahanka Air Force Station, in North Bengaluru, close to Kempegowda International Airport (14 km) and 21 km from Bangalore City Junction Majestic. Although it’s far from the city centre, it is accessible by BMTC buses passing through the college campus itself. BMTC route numbers are 282, 283,

Academics 
Undergraduate Course (60 intake)
 BDS (Five-year program that leads to a Bachelor Of Dental Surgery)

Post Graduate Courses (38 intake)
 MDS (Three-year program that leads to a Master of Dental Surgery)
 Oral Medicine and Radiology
 Pediatric and Preventive Dentistry
 Oral and Maxillofacial Surgery
 Periodontology
 Orthodontics and Dentofacial Orthopaedics
 Conservative Dentistry and Endodontics
 Prosthodontics and Crown & Bridge
 Oral and Maxillofacial Pathology
 Public Health Dentistry
Certificate Courses

 Implantology

College Emblem

The Emblem of the Krishnadevaraya college of dental Sciences is a symbolic expression of the confluence of both Eastern and Western Health Sciences.

A Central Wand with Entwined snakes:symbolizes Greek and Roman Gods of Health called Hermes and Mercury is adapted as symbol of modern Medical Sciences.

The Flame: Symbolizes the immortality and cure from all sufferings

The pair of Tusk: Symbolizes the specialization

The Script Humanity, Sacrifice, Humanity, Dedication: Explains the oath taken by all doctors in the service of humankind

Infrastructure
KCDS is a three storied building with attached Dental Hospital. College has four audio-visually equipped Lecture halls with sufficient number of desk to accommodate 60 UG students.
An aesthetically designed Auditorium is built within the College building which provides space to organize various cultural events, graduation ceremony, scientific seminars, orientation day, College day etc.
College also had an attached 100 bed general hospital " Krishnadevaraya General Hospital and Research Centre " which has been closed recently.
All departments has separate clinical section for both UG and PG with enough number of dental operating chairs. Where trainee doctors can operate upon patient under direct supervision of well qualified senior doctors.
College has two spacious Pre-Clinical lab each for Prosthodontics and Conservative Dentistry to train newly admitted UG students.

Facility

Hospital
College has well equipped teaching dental hospital attached to its main building. Being only hospital to serve numerous villages splattered around this area the number of patients coming in is enough to give practical exposure to the students.
The college is also attached to the 100- bedded Government General Hospital, Yelahanka, which is within a distance of 7 km from the college, for additional clinical training of the students on OT facilities for the oral & maxillofacial surgeries and General Medicine and General Surgery Hospital training for Under Graduates. College also has tie up with Malige Hospital for major OT facility. A new OT complex is under construction within College premises.

General
Apart from the Dental College, campus has an Engineering college (Sir M. Visvesvaraya Institute of Technology), one Architecture college (Sir M.V School of Architecture as well with Business Administration and Computer Application department to offer BE, B. Arch, M.Tech, MBA, MCA. Campus has an extension Counter of Kotak Mahindra ING Vyasa bank with 7am-11pm ATM facility, a book stall, two stationary shops and a Coffee shop in Engineering College premises. There is a common canteen facility for both Dental College and Engineering College provides only vegetarian foods. The Institute power requirements are met by a dedicated HT Power Connection from BESCOM and Captive Power Generating units.

Transportation
Although the distance is walkable there is auto facility available to commute the main highway (₹10/- on sharing) . A BMTC bus number 283A runs through the campus connecting campus to the city market.
College Bus facility is also provided by the college at an additional Rs. 11,000/- per year. In college bus facility House Surgeons ( Internee) gets pass for free transportation.

Accommodation 
College has separate hostel facilities for both men and women, and staff quarters for college staff, a bungalow for Principal and a Guest House within the campus. Hostel
s are common to all dental students as well as the engineering students.

Sports

Campus has a Football ground, a Cricket ground, a Basketball court, a Lawn Tennis court, three open court for Throwball ; Tennikoit ; Volleyball. Campus also has an Indoor Stadium, Table Tennis hall.

Gymnasium
College has a gymnasium with good facilities and a physical instructor.

Amenities Centre
College has separate amenities centre for both men and women

Students

KCDS is a small India with students from every corner of the India from Kashmir to Kanyakumari ; From Gujarat to Arunachal Pradesh. KCDS is Place for many International Students from Iran ; Iraq ; Bangladesh ; Sri Lanka.

Attendance
Krishnadevaraya College of Dental Sciences (KCDS) is quite stubborn about attendance issues. 75–80% is mandatory for both Theory and Clinical sessions and everyone complies with it.

Uniform
College has strict no to casual dress. All students and staff are requested to wear formal dresses with white aprons.
Long sleeve aprons are for Staff, PG and Internees; Half sleeve aprons are for UG students. It is mandatory for Students to carry a Name Plate showing Student's name and department (UG uses white engraving on a black plate while Internees, PG, Staff uses Brass name plate).

Hang outs
There are many places to hang out nearby. College campus itself provides a cafeteria and a canteen for short time refreshment during hospital postings. For foodies Adyar Ananda Bhavan ; Parika restaurant with buffet ; Kudla Seafood Restaurant and many others are there. Nearest McDonald's restaurant is 9 km away. For adventurous students Nandi Hills is close by for a quick bike riding and an Embassy International Horse Riding School nearby.

List of Principals

Festivals

College Celebrates "KrishDent" annually which integrates Sports day and Cultural day. Which officially has started from 2011. Students give a unique name to each year " KrishDent " 

KCDS Organises an intercollege cricket competition "KrishDent Cup" in the memory of KCDS college staff Dr. Bharath Parthasarathy, who has lost his life at very early age.
College students also organize unofficially Krishnadevaraya Cricket League (KCL) once in every six months within college groups

Gallery

References

External links

Dental colleges in Karnataka
Educational institutions established in 1992
Colleges in Bangalore
1992 establishments in Karnataka